Buli is a 2004 Malaysian Malay-language black comedy drama film directed by Afdlin Shauki in his directorial debut. The film stars Afdlin himself, along with Hans Isaac, Nasha Aziz, Ako Mustapha, and Sharifah Shahirah as well as cameo appearances from well-known Malaysian celebrities. Its sequel, Buli Balik was released in 2006.

Plot
The plot of this film started with Nordin standing in the middle of the city of Kuala Lumpur as he gazed around him. Starting here, Nordin narrate the history of his life, including being a victim of bullying while in school while acknowledging not have many friends.

Nordin, 28 years old, still single and yet to be married, worked as a software designer at the Michealsoft, a computer company owned by Tan Sri Michael (Patrick Teoh), Nordin was with Michaelsoft for three years. Meetings are held at the Michealsoft headquarters, Tan Sri Michael announced sales of computer anti-virus software KABELUPUKOM Version 1.1, which has penetrated the world market. Nordin arrived at the office, and Tan Sri Michael announced that it has take a new staff in the company. A Mitsubishi Lancer car came and hit the road marker for the disabled. The new staff is Roy, Nordin's childhood friend. Roy joined the company to lead the project for creating the software security system for the Japanese company. When Nordin surprised by Roy's presence, he gets out of the meeting and has not had time to leave, Roy called him, as he dubbed it "Boyot".

Nordin remembering past events during the secondary school: In 1991, Roy and sit level 3. Roy bullying Nordin by trying to insert his head in toilet. Apparently, it was a dream, Nordin screaming while immersing his head in a sink filled with water and see the mirror. Roy came, and asked him to do a working paper reports to clients. Nordin bridge itself in wall toilets and dream again, he turns into The Incredible Hulk with the rest of his body is blue, while his clothes torn his body as a result of growing up, and he scares Roy.

Nordin is insecure with his body shape and feels too ashamed with his fatty body. While exercising at the gym, he saw the 'Lu Slim Lah Beb' ('Lookin' Slim Babe') infomercial on television and tries to call the products' phone number. Roy celebrates his 28th birthday at the hotel and he brings Nordin together. He introduces him to his friends and humiliated him by calling him "Boyot" and gives him a swimming trunk. At his home, Nordin calls Dr. Ika for help where he can undergo the therapy session. Meanwhile, Roy and his friends enjoy partying at the hotel's karaoke center. Rudy, who has a permanent scar on his face, came with a suitcase and shows them a lot of money in the suitcase where they liked. Rudy offers Roy to help him in a 'big project' which is robbing the bank using the software system that the company made and Rudy asking Roy for not to double-crossed him. After that, Rudy sang a Malay ballad tune, "Kau Kunci Cintaku Di Dalam Hatimu" ("You Locked My Love In Your Heart"), made famous by Ramlah Ram.

Nordin, who was on medical leave, hanging out with Dr. Ika. Tan Sri Michael warns Roy to completing the client report, otherwise he would get fired by his boss. He insist that rather be known by his nickname instead of his real name, Masron and asking Nordin's whereabouts. Nordin and Dr. Ika enjoys watching movies in cinema and later they eating at a restaurant where the skyline of KL was seen. The fireworks was displayed on the night of New Year celebration. Dr. Ika tells Nordin about his New Year Resolution and he replies to her that he determined to undergo her therapy session this year. The fireworks continues to sparkling in the sky. While Nordin wants to go home, Roy came to him. He blames Nordin as he nearly got fired by the boss because the security system that their team need to do not done yet. Roy then beating him without mercy although Nordin asking for apologize and he warns Nordin to hand over the report to him and beat him again before left. Nordin's housemate, Shaf is so angry to Roy asking him to go to clinic to seeking medical treatment after being beaten by Roy, but Nordin refused. Nordin tells Shaf that he has met an angel who will changed his life, but Shaf asking to him did he okay?.

On the next day, Nordin came to the office. While in the lift, he afraid to Roy. But Roy reconcile with Nordin by asking for apologize. Roy tells Nordin that he was stress, so he took his stress out to him. Nordin then hand over the report document to Roy. Roy asks Nordin to buy some food to eat While Nordin go out to buy food, he tries to copy all of Nordin's work of the security system. He deletes all evidences that Nordin has in his computer and putting a sleeping pills in his drink. When Nordin comes back, Roy is gone. He tried to open his computer, but failed. He slept over his desk until morning and only woke up after Tan Sri Michael come to take his security system to shown to the Japanese but Nordin unable to give as it is vanished from his computer. Roy came and act as a hero as he told Tan Sri Michael that he has created the security system by himself in case if anything happen to Nordin's. After failed to shown his security system, Nordin was fired by his boss. Nordin tells Roy that his security system is his work but Roy say that nobody will trust him as he has no evidence to prove so. Roy tells Nordin that he can't do anything to him as he will always to be better than him. Dr. Ika's younger sister, Ila suffers from asthma while doing exercise at the gymnasium. Ila tells her mother and sister that her ex-husband, Zul to get married with the stewardess and pray for her ex-husband's happiness. Nordin come home while his housemate, Shaf watching the football match between Liverpool and Manchester United on TV. Shaf called him to watch to the football match together, but ignored by Nordin. Upset with what happened to him, Nordin grab the knife and enter the bathroom to commit suicide, luckily Shaf come on save him but unfortunately, Shaf failed to grab the knife from Nordin and the knife landed on his foot.

Meanwhile, Roy and Tan Sri Michael with their Japanese clients having dinner at the restaurant. Rudy worked as the waiter there and tells them if everything is alright. After the dinner time, Roy came to changing room and meet Rudy. He passed the software security system to Rudy and tell him to prepare when the security system's code is activated, so he can enter the bank. Shaf was at the hospital where he receives treatment due to injury at his foot. Nordin want to explained about what happened but Dr. Ika decided to use her authority to send him at the psychiatric ward of the hospital where she worked. After recovered from his foot injury, Shaf come back home and decided to take his belongings and no longer lives with Nordin. While in the psychiatric ward, Nordin speaks to an old man who is thinking of his children and the man explained to him that his children did not want claim that he is their father and his children no longer have any relationship to him anymore. Nordin decided to stay away from the old man who keeps telling about fathers as the old man insist to not seeking apologize from his children. Nordin then met Dr. Ika and tells her to prove that he is not insane and decided to get out from the hospital as he want to claim his right at the Michaelsoft.

When Nordin goes home, his housemate, Shaf no longer lives with him. He decided to find the CD-ROM in his house, eventually found in his computer book. Rudy and his underlings enters the Allied Asian Bank and doing their 'big project'. Nordin and Roy competed to access the software security system as Tan Sri Michael gave an instruction and will call the police if they failed to do so. While focus to create the system, both of them enters to the fantasy realm where they became a robot and competed each other. Back to the reality, Roy managed to access the system and tells his boss that his security system will disabled in 3 minutes while Nordin still working to access the system. Rudy and his underlings managed to robbing the bank and decided to leave the bank immediately. Nordin managed to activated the software security system that shows he is the one who created it and prove Roy's wrongdoings. Rudy's underlings has been detained by the police before they left the bank, while the police conduct a raid on the bank, Rudy manage to escape when he realizes the police's presence while the security system on his laptop has been denied. Tan Sri Michael decided to call the police and Roy manages to escape when his criminal act was known by his boss and the rest of Michaelsoft staffs after Nordin revealed Roy's wrongdoings. Tan Sri Michael seeking apologize from Nordin as he didn't trust him and Nordin also seeking apologize from his boss that he also done wrong to him. Nordin decided to find his friend, Shaf.

Roy and Rudy is being hunted by the police. Roy's residence was raided by the police but he is not around there. Nordin managed to find Shaf and seeking for forgiveness as well as talking each other to him again. Roy, who has been hunted by the police due to his connection with the Allied Asian Bank robbery, still out there and taking an advantage to get revenge against Nordin. He wanted to hit Nordin by his car. Dr. Ika saw Roy driving and she tries to warns Nordin and Shaf but they didn't realize the actual situation that they are facing right now. Roy drive through the road even though the traffic light is red, so he getting crashed by the lorry that come from the other side before he able to hit Nordin and his car flipping over. The lorry was drove by Rudy, who just committed another criminal act. Rudy become panicked when he saw there are people when he crashed on Roy, so he ran away from the accident scene. Nordin, Shaf, Dr. Ika and a taxi driver came to the accident scene and they saw Roy in his car. In the end, Nordin now lives happier and no longer afraid to Roy as he involved in a road accident when he try to crash on him. Nordin has gained shares from Michaelsoft and he become partner with his boss.

Cast 
 Afdlin Shauki as Nordin Bin Rohani
 Nasha Aziz as Dr. Ika
 Hans Isaac as Masron Bin Haji Dasuki @ Roy
 Ako Mustapha as Shaf
 Hattan as Jalal
 Patrick Teoh as Tan Sri Michael
 Sharifah Shahirah as Ila
 Kartina Aziz as Dr. Ika and Ila's mum
 Ifa Raziah as Michaelsoft's clerk
 Soraya Dean as Suzy
 AC Mizal as Rudy

Production
Buli is a directorial debut from Afdlin Shauki. Filming took place in Kuala Lumpur and Negeri Sembilan and its budget approximately RM 1.5 million in total. Afdlin's daughters, Miasara and Anais portraying as the children of the pilot that portrayed by himself.

The film's screenplay was written by Afdlin while pursue scriptwriting course at the National Film School in London, United Kingdom (UK) in 1996. The film is said to be produced by renowned Malaysian lyricist, Habsah Hassan while the female lead role was once offered to Erra Fazira and Sofia Jane before offered to Nasha Aziz. The main role is originally named Roslin, a bank clerk. But it was changed to Nordin, a computer software designer.

Release and reception  
Buli was released on 11 March 2004 to popular success. The film managed to gain RM 1.6 million upon its release. Suraiya Mohd Nor, reviewing for Berita Harian described the film as a "global phenomenon".

Sequel
Its sequel, Buli Balik was released in 2006, after the success of the first film.

References

External links
 

Malaysian comedy films
2004 films
Films directed by Afdlin Shauki
Films with screenplays by Afdlin Shauki
2004 directorial debut films